Pow-Wows; or, Long Lost Friend is a book by John George Hohman published in 1820.  Hohman was a Pennsylvania Dutch healer; the book is a collection of home- and folk-remedies, as well as spells and talismans.

Description
It is a translation of a German original, Der lange verborgene Freund, oder, Getreuer und Christlicher Unterricht für jedermann, enthaltend: wunderbare und probmäßige Mittel und Künste, sowohl für die Menschen als das Vieh ("The Long Hidden Friend, or, True and Christian Instructions for Everyone. Comprising Wonderful and Well Tested Remedies and Arts, for Men as well as for Livestock.") The folk magic tradition called "pow-wowing" takes its name from the title of later editions of this book.

Folklorist and novelist Manly Wade Wellman referred to the book and the traditions it embodies (one of which being that if the book is carried on one's person it will act as a shield against bad fortune), especially in his "Silver John" stories such as Who Fears the Devil?.

The book gained some notoriety when it was found in the possession of John Blymire, a Pennsylvania man who was charged with murdering a neighbor whom he believed to have put a curse on him.

Contents
The contents of the book are varied.  They include such matters as:

Forms of composed prayer;

A MORNING PRAYER TO BE SPOKEN BEFORE STARTING ON A JOURNEY, WHICH WILL SAVE THE PERSON FROM ALL MISHAPS.

I (here the name is to be pronounced) will go on a journey to-day; I will walk upon God's way, and walk where God himself did walk, and our dear Lord Jesus Christ, and our dearest Virgin with her dear little babe, with her seven rings and her true things. Oh, thou! my dear Lord Jesus Christ, I am thine own, that no dog may bite me, no wolf bite me, and no murderer secretly approach me; save me, O my God, from sudden death! I am in God's hands, and there I will bind myself. In God's hands I am by our Lord Jesus' five wounds, that any gun or other arms may not do me any more harm than the virginity of our Holy Virgin Mary was injured by the favor of her beloved Jesus. After this say three Lord's prayers, the Ave Maria, and the articles of faith.

recipes, apparently without any magical intents;

TO MAKE GOOD BEER.

Take a handful of hops, five or six gallons of water, about three tablespoonfuls of ginger, half a gallon of molasses; filter the water, hops and ginger into a tub containing the molasses.

home remedies without explicit supernatural elements:

CURE FOR THE TOOTHACHE.

Hohman, the author of this book, has cured the severest toothache more than sixty times, with this remedy, and, out of the sixty times he applied it, it failed but once in affecting a cure. Take blue vitriol and put a piece of it in the hollow tooth, yet not too much; spit out the water that collects in the mouth, and be careful to swallow none. I do not know whether it is good for teeth that are not hollow, but I should judge it would cure any kind of toothache.

other remedies, in which supernatural or at least ritual elements occur:

A WELL-TRIED PLASTER TO REMOVE MORTIFICATION

Take six hen's eggs and boil them in hot ashes until they are right hard; then take the yellow of the eggs and fry them in a gill of lard until they are quite black; then put a handful of rue with it, and afterward filter it through a cloth. When this is done add a gill of sweet oil to it. It will take most effect where the plaster for a female is prepared by a male, and the plaster for a male prepared by a female.

and outright spells:

ANOTHER WAY TO STILL-BIND THIEVES.

Ye thieves, I conjure you, to be obedient like Jesus Christ, who obeyed his Heavenly Father unto the cross, and to stand without moving out of my sight, in the name of the Trinity. I command you by the power of God and the incarnation of Jesus Christ, not to move out of my sight, + + + like Jesus Christ was standing on Jordan's stormy banks to be baptized by John. And furthermore, I conjure you, horse and rider, to stand still and not to move out of my sight, like Jesus Christ did stand when he was about to be nailed to the cross to release the fathers of the church from the bonds of hell.. Ye thieves, I bind you with the same bonds with which Jesus our Lord has bound hell; and thus ye shall be bound; + + + and the same words that bind you shall also release you.

TO EFFECT THE SAME IN LESS TIME.

Thou horseman and footman, you are coming under your hats; you are scattered! With the blood of Jesus Christ, with his five holy wounds, thy barrel, thy gun,. and thy pistol are bound; sabre, sword, and knife are enchanted and bound, in the name of God the Father. the Son, and the Holy Ghost. Amen.

This must be spoken three times.

References

External links 
Pow-Wows; or, Long Lost Friend (entire text)
Original text of 1850 edition

1820 books
Occult books
Pennsylvania Dutch culture